Syarhey Alyaksandravich Kandratsyew (born 2 February 1990) is a Belarusian former professional football player.

External links

1990 births
Living people
Footballers from Minsk
Belarusian footballers
Association football defenders
FC Minsk players
FC Dinamo Minsk players
FC Gomel players
FC Dynamo Brest players
FC Naftan Novopolotsk players
FC Belshina Bobruisk players